Shri Radha Vallabh Temple, also called Shri Radha Vallabhlal ji Temple is a historic temple in the city of Vrindavan, Mathura district, Uttar Pradesh, India. The temple is dedicated to Hindu deities Radha Krishna. The central deity of the temple is Krishna who is worshiped under the name of Shri Radha Vallabh which means the consort of Radha. Alongside Krishna, a crown is placed which signifies the presence of goddess Radha. The temple belongs to Radha Vallabh Sampradaya and was constructed in 16th century under the guidance of Vrindavan saint Hith Harivansha Mahaprabhu.

History 
Old Radhavallabh Temple, which is presently known as Hith Mandir in Vrindavan was constructed in 1585 A.D by Sundardas Bhatnagar, a disciple of Shri Vanachandra, son of Hith Harivansh Mahaprabhu. At that time, Sundardas Bhatnagar of Deoband was under the employment of Abdul Rahim Khankhana, the chief head at Akbar's court. Through Abdul Rahim Khankhana, Sundardas Bhatnagar not only got the Royal permission to use Red sandstone for the construction of temple, which was used only for construction of imperial buildings, royal palaces and forts at that time but also got monetary grant for this temple from Akbar. Descendants of Sundardas Bhatnagar at Deoband still have the temple documents with them. It is said that King Maan Singh first decided to construct this temple. But on hearing a legend that whosoever construct this temple would die within a year, he backed out. Though later the legend did come true. Sundardas Bhatnagar who constructed the temple died within a year, soon after the construction of the temple was complete.

Legend of Temple Deity 

According to popular legend, the deity Radhavallabh was never made by any sculptor. The deity was given to a devotee named Atmadev by Shiva himself because of his arduous devotion and prayers. The Hith Harivansh Mahaprabhu lived 31 years in place called Devavan. In the 32nd year of his age, he left for Vrindavan. On his way to Vrindavan, he was ordered by goddess Radha herself to marry the daughters of Atmadev and took the idol of Radha Vallabhji to Vrindavan with them. As ordered, Hith Harivansh Mahaprabhu married the daughters of Atmadev and Atmadev gifted the idol of Radhavallabh ji to his daughters and Harivansh Mahaprabhu on their marriage.

Architecture 
Shri Radha Vallabh Temple was situated near Gotam Nagar on the cliff near Bankey Bihari temple. The stands out due to its striking architecture and magnificence decor. Constructed in 1585, the Radha Vallabh temple is one of the oldest and long-living temples, majestically built using red sandstones at a time when they were used for building only high palaces, imperial buildings and royal forts. The wall of the temple is 10 feet thick and are pierced in 2 stages.

Festivals 
The Radha Vallabh temple is famous for its colorful and vibrant festivals. The major festivals of the temple are -

 Hitotsav -  It is a 11 days long festival commemorating the founder of Radha-vallabha tradition, Hith Harivansh Mahaprabhu. 
 Radhastami - It is a 9 days long grand festival which celebrated the birth anniversary of Goddess Radha, the guru (mentor) of Radha-vallabha tradition.
 Krishna Janmashtami - The festival celebrates the birth anniversary of Krishna, the consort of Radha.
 Vyahlu Utsav - This festival celebrates the wedding ceremony of Radha Krishna. This festival is locally known as Byahovala of the Lord and is also called Manoratha. The temple is flocked with devotees on such ceremony and becomes the center of prime attraction for such different rituals.

The other annual festivals of the temple include - Holi, Diwali, Sharad Purnima, Dussehra, Jhulan Utsav, Phool Banglas (Floral Archades), Sanjhi Utsav and Patotsava.

Timings 
The time zone (UTC+05:30) observed through India by the priest.

Morning - 05:00 am to 12:00 pm.

Evening - 06:00 pm to 09:00 pm.

Nearby attractions 

 Bankey Bihari Temple
 Nidhivan, Vrindavan
 Radha Raman Temple
 Radha Damodar temple, Vrindavan
 Radha Madan Mohan Temple, Vrindavan

See also 

 Radha Kund
 Radha Krishna
 Kusum Sarovar
 Radha Vallabh Sampradaya
 Radha Rani Temple
 Hith Harivansha Mahaprabhu
 Radha Krishna Vivah Sthali, Bhandirvan

References

External links 
 https://www.radhavallabhmandir.com/index.php

Krishna temples
Radha Krishna temples
Hindu temples in Mathura district
Vrindavan
Tourist attractions in Mathura district
16th-century Hindu temples